The Shire of Boonah was a local government area in South East Queensland, Australia, about  southwest of Brisbane.

The shire was part of the "Scenic Rim", a group of mountain ranges forming part of the Great Dividing Range, and contained four national parks—Main Range, Mount French, Moogerah Peaks and Mount Greville National Park which is now part of Moogerah Peaks National Park.

History

The Goolman Division was incorporated on 11 November 1879 under the Divisional Boards Act 1879 with a population of 1,542. It was centred on Boonah and its board consisting of six councillors.  On 4 January 1884, there was an adjustment of boundaries between No. 2 subdivision of Mutdapilly Division and subdivision No. 2 of the Goolman Division.  Initially, the Goolman Division had its office in Flinders. However, in 1887, the railway line from Ipswich was extended to Boonah, and the Goolman Division office moved to Boonah.

On 25 October 1890, part of the northern section of Goolman Division became part of the new Normanby Division.  With the passage of the Local Authorities Act 1902, Goolman Division became the Shire of Goolman on 31 March 1903.  The Shire offices were in High Street, Boonah.  The Goolman Shire War Memorial was unveiled in Boonah (then part of the Goolman Shire) on 19 May 1920 by General Birdwood and Councillor Alexander John Tait McKay. It is generally known as the Boonah War Memorial. On 14 October 1937 was renamed Shire of Boonah, which apparently means "bloodwood tree" in the local Aboriginal language.

Greater Ipswich Scheme of 1949
On 29 January 1949, a new Local Government Act was enacted to further amalgamate local government in the Ipswich area, abolishing the Shires of Normanby and Rosewood. The City of Ipswich was enlarged (from 12¼ square miles to 30 square miles) to include the more urban parts of the Shire of Moreton (formerly known as the Shire of Ipswich). The Shire of Moreton was then enlarged by the inclusion of the northern part of the Shire of Normanby and all the Shire of Rosewood. The southern part of the Shire of Normanby was transferred to an enlarged Shire of Boonah (a gain of 384 people and ).

The council for the enlarged Shire of Boonah was subdivided into three divisions, each electing three councillors.

Amalgamations in 2000
In March 2000, Boonah added to its area part of the City of Ipswich, including Mount Walker, Warrill View and Rosevale, and the divisions were abolished, with a seven-member council representing the entire district.

Amalgamations of 2008
On 15 March 2008, under the Local Government (Reform Implementation) Act 2007 passed by the Parliament of Queensland on 10 August 2007, Boonah merged with the southern rural section of the Shire of Beaudesert and the Harrisville–Peak Crossing section of the City of Ipswich to form the Scenic Rim Region.

Towns and localities
The Shire of Boonah included the following settlements:

 Boonah
 Aratula
 Charlwood
 Coulson
 Fassifern
 Harrisville1
 Kalbar
 Maroon
 Moogerah
 Mount Alford
 Mount Walker
 Roadvale
 Rosevale
 Silverdale
 Tarome
 Templin
 Warrill View

1 - split with the City of Ipswich

Population

# The estimated 1947 population of the post-1949 area was 6,239.

Chairmen and mayors

 1880: Charles William Hunt
 1915: William Ramsden Bowman (the great-grandson of John Macarthur) 
 1927: W. Farley
 1943-1947 Harold Richter
 1959–1961: Oliver Walter Hooper. He was the grandson of one of the original landowners of the area that became the town of Boonah. Many of the streets of Boonah are named after his aunts & uncles. Oliver was a member of the Boonah Shire Council for 15 years, becoming chairman (mayor) and dying during his second term.
 1994–2008: John Brent. he is one of the longest continuing serving elected members in Australia with almost 40 years of service and over twenty as mayor. He was first elected as a councillor in the Shire of Boonah in 1976 and was chairman of the Shire of Boonah since 12 April 1994, becoming mayor of the Scenic Rim Region in 2008 following the amalgamation.

See also

 List of divisional boards in Queensland

References

External links

Further reading
  (70 pages)
  (349 pages)
  (171 pages – mostly photocopied newspaper articles)

Boonah
1880 establishments in Australia
2008 disestablishments in Australia
Populated places disestablished in 2008